A dialer management platform (DMP) is used to dynamically update the information held within a least cost routing dialler.  The dialler is programmed to call into the DMP periodically, when it does it can supply the service provider with information such as calling patterns.

The DMP at the same time can reprogram the dialler with new routing tables in order to supply the end user better calling rates.

Telephony
Telecommunications economics
Teletraffic